Windows Live Alerts (formerly MSN Alerts) was a part of the Windows Live services from Microsoft that allowed users to get notification of time-sensitive events and information from various alert content providers. Users were able to choose how and when to receive alerts, so that users may stay informed no matter where they are.

Windows Live Alerts was a free service for users with a Windows Live ID (now Microsoft account). However, some content providers or wireless service providers may charge for using their content or service with Windows Live Alerts. Alerts to wireless devices are available to users in the United States, Canada and China only.

Windows Live Alerts was discontinued from September 30, 2010.

Features
Windows Live Alerts offered the following main features for users to manage their alerts:
Set or change time zone
Specify where Windows Live Alerts are sent
Receive alerts with Windows Live Messenger
Receive alerts on a mobile device
View a list of recently received alerts
Set quiet times when no alerts will be sent
Unsubscribe or turn off alerts

Integration
Windows Live Alerts integrates tightly with Windows Live Messenger, Windows Live Hotmail (now Outlook.com) and Windows Live Mobile. An "Alerts" tab is available in Windows Live Messenger showing a list of recent alerts organized by date or provider's name. When a new alert arrives, a "toast" will appear in the user's screen showing the alert's headline. If the user is signed out of Messenger, the user can choose to have the alerts sent to their e-mail or mobile devices.

Syndication Edition
Windows Live Alerts Syndication Edition allows bloggers and other content providers to keep their readers up-to-date and drive traffic to their websites by providing alerts services to their blogs and websites. Content providers are only required to publish their contents via RSS or Atom feeds and place a "Windows Live Alerts Sign-Up" link on their websites to utilize this service. Users may then subscribe to these alerts by clicking on the sign-up link. New contents' headlines will be automatically distributed via an alert to readers through Windows Live Messenger, Hotmail (now Outlook.com) or a mobile device, depending on the reader's alert settings.

Readers can modify their subscription settings or opt out of alerts subscription by the content providers at any time.

Content providers may choose to have three different types of "toast" notifications displayed on their reader's screen when new alerts arrive:
Classic Alert - an instant-messaging based alert with a small logo of the content provider
Branded Alert - an instant-messaging based alert to which branding is applied
Alert with Advertisement - an instant-messaging based alert where an applicable advertisement is associated with the notification
Currently, the "Branded Alert" option is only available to limited chosen content providers and under testing, while the new "Alert with Advertisement" option is only available for MSN Weather alerts.

See also
Windows Live
Windows Live Messenger
Windows Live Hotmail
Windows Live Hotmail Calendar

External links
 Official website (Archive)
 Official website (Archive)
Windows Live Alerts Blog
Windows Live Alerts SDK

Alerts

es:Windows Live Alerts